Metraria is a genus of two species of fungi in the family Agaricaceae.

See also
List of Agaricaceae genera
List of Agaricales genera

References

Agaricaceae
Agaricales genera
Taxa named by Mordecai Cubitt Cooke